Penny Sweet (born 16 October 1957) is a British rower. She competed in the women's eight event at the 1980 Summer Olympics.

References

External links
 

1957 births
Living people
British female rowers
Olympic rowers of Great Britain
Rowers at the 1980 Summer Olympics
Sportspeople from Bath, Somerset